The 1961 NCAA Soccer Tournament was the third organized men's college soccer tournament by the National Collegiate Athletic Association, to determine the top college soccer team in the United States. The West Chester Golden Rams won their first title, defeating the two-time defending champion Saint Louis Billikens in the final on November 25, 1961, by a score of 2–0. The tournament was played in St. Louis, Missouri.

Teams

Bracket

See also 
 1961 NAIA Soccer Championship

References 

Championship
NCAA Division I Men's Soccer Tournament seasons
NCAA
NCAA
NCAA Soccer Tournament
NCAA Soccer Tournament